Karl Frank Klein (October 17, 1922 – June 22, 2006) was an educator, farmer and political figure in Saskatchewan. He represented Notukeu-Willow Bunch from 1956 to 1964 in the Legislative Assembly of Saskatchewan as a Liberal.

He was born in Lafleche, Saskatchewan. Klein served overseas as a wireless operator in the Royal Canadian Navy during World War II. After the war, he attended teacher's college and received a degree in education from the University of Manitoba. In 1948, Klein married Agnes McCarthy.

References 

Saskatchewan Liberal Party MLAs
1922 births
2006 deaths
People from Lafleche, Saskatchewan
Royal Canadian Navy personnel of World War II
Canadian military personnel from Saskatchewan